Lesk may refer to:
 Łęsk, a settlement in Warmian-Masurian Voivodeship, Poland
 Arthur M. Lesk, American molecular biologist
 Mike Lesk, American computer scientist
 Lesk algorithm, a classical algorithm for word sense disambiguation
 Training Air Wing, Finnish Air Force, the Finnish Air Force pilot jet aircraft training school